Houston County is a county located in the U.S. state of Tennessee. As of the 2020 census, the population was 8,283. Its county seat is Erin. The county was founded in 1871. It was named for Sam Houston.

Geography

Adjacent counties
Stewart County - north
Montgomery County - northeast
Dickson County - east
Humphreys County - south
Benton County - west

Major highways
State Route 13
State Route 46
State Route 49
State Route 147
State Route 149
State Route 231
State Route 232

Demographics

2020 census

As of the 2020 United States census, there were 8,283 people, 2,878 households, and 1,750 families residing in the county.

2000 census
As of the census of 2000, there were 8,088 people, 3,216 households, and 2,299 families residing in the county. The population density was 40.4 people per square mile (15.6/km2). There were 3,901 housing units at an average density of 19.5 per square mile (7.5/km2). The racial makeup of the county was 94.58% White, 3.31% Black or African American, 0.19% Native American, 0.12% Asian, 0.06% Pacific Islander, 0.78% from other races, and 0.95% from two or more races. 1.25% of the population were Hispanic or Latino of any race.

There were 3,216 households, out of which 31.10% had children under the age of 18 living with them, 57.00% were married couples living together, 10.40% had a female householder with no husband present, and 28.50% were non-families. 25.30% of all households were made up of individuals, and 12.10% had someone living alone who was 65 years of age or older. The average household size was 2.46 and the average family size was 2.92.

In the county, the population was spread out, with 24.40% under the age of 18, 7.30% from 18 to 24, 26.10% from 25 to 44, 25.60% from 45 to 64, and 16.70% who were 65 years of age or older. The median age was 40 years. For every 100 females there were 97.80 males. For every 100 females age 18 and over, there were 95.00 males.

The median income for a household in the county was $29,968, and the median income for a family was $35,395. Males had a median income of $29,528 versus $19,983 for females. The per capita income for the county was $15,614. About 14.30% of families and 18.10% of the population were below the poverty line, including 23.20% of those under age 18 and 20.80% of those age 65 or over.

Government
Like many other rural southern and/or Appalachian counties, Houston County was a Democratic stronghold at the presidential level, but due to a combination of factors (such as the party's national shift on social liberalism, a direct contrast to the social conservatism of the region; lack of support for workers in these counties; and, arguably, racial/cultural animus to Barack Obama's campaign in 2008), the county (and state as a whole) has sped rapidly toward the Republican Party. The county's last Democratic presidential preference, Obama, won here in 2008, but by a much closer margin than any winning Democrat in recent memory.

Today's Houston County is as solidly Republican as historically GOP-friendly East Tennessee.

The Board of Commissioners meets at the Houston County Courthouse the third Monday of odd months (January, March, May, July, September, November).

Elected officials
County Mayor: Joey Brake 
County Clerk: Robert Brown
Administrator of Elections: Annette Pulley
Property Assessor: Joy Hooper
Register of Deeds: Sherrill Potts Moore
County Trustee: Jimmy Lowery
County Highway Department Superintendent: Teresa Alsobrooks
County Circuit Court Clerk: Donna Potts Vincent
General Sessions & Juvenile Judge: W. Sidney Vinson
Sheriff: Kevin L. Sugg

Commissioners
District 1: William C. Agy and Ann Fielder
District 2: Randall French and J. Steve Hall
District 3: Glen Baggett and Danny Warren
District 4: Charles Darrell Kingsmill and Howard Spurgeon
District 5: Lance Uffelman and Vickie Reedy
District 6: Joey Brake and Chris Pitts
District 7: Brant Lamastus and Tony Hayes

Politics
Houston County was historically one of the state's most Democratic counties, however, like other socially conservative rural counties, it has trended hard right in recent years.. Formerly a part of Tennessee's 8th congressional district, which was represented by Blue Dog Democrat John Tanner, Houston County is now part of Tennessee's 7th congressional district and is represented by Republican Mark Green.

The county has been among the most consistently Democratic in the state on presidential elections. Democratic candidates failed to carry Houston County at the presidential level only twice prior to 2012. In 1928, Herbert Hoover became the first Republican presidential candidate to ever carry Houston County, due to anti-Catholic voting against Al Smith in this "Bible Belt" region. The second non-Democrat to carry Houston County was George Wallace of the American Independent Party during the 1968 presidential election, following which Houston County became one of only six Wallace counties to vote for George McGovern against Richard Nixon's 3,000-plus-county landslide of 1972.

In the 2008 presidential election, when most other traditionally Democratic counties in the state voted for John McCain, Houston County supported Barack Obama. However, the county's vote has been shifting Republican as reflected by Barack Obama's winning margin of barely more than 2%, the lowest margin among all Democratic presidential candidates who have carried Houston County since its creation. In the 2012 presidential election, Mitt Romney became the first Republican in 80 years to win the county. Republican Senator Bob Corker and Republican Representative Marsha Blackburn also won the county.

In 2016, the county swung hard to the right, with Republican Donald Trump winning it by more than 40 percentage points, a massive shift from Romney's margin of less than 6 points.  As such, the county has become substantially more Republican than the state as a whole, voting similarly to the rock-ribbed Republican counties of East Tennessee.

Education

Public high schools
Houston County High School - (Students: 465; Location: 2500 State Route 149; Grades: 09 - 12)
Houston County Adult High School - (Students: 2; Location: 3573 West Main Street; Grades: 11 - 12)

Public primary/middle schools
Erin Elementary School - (Students: 456; Location: 6500 State Route 13; Grades: KG - 05)
Tennessee Ridge Elementary School - (Students: 280; Location: 135 School Street; Grades: KG - 05)
Houston County Middle School - (Students: 338; Location: 1241 West Main Street; Grades: 06 - 08)

Media
FM radio: WTPR-FM 101.7 (website) "The Greatest Hits of All Time"
Weekly newspaper: Houston County Herald  
""Tv Station""Wells Creek Basin Network

Communities

City
Erin (county seat)

Town
Tennessee Ridge (small part in Stewart County)

Unincorporated communities
McKinnon
Stewart

See also
National Register of Historic Places listings in Houston County, Tennessee

Further reading

History of Houston County, Tennessee 1871 - 1996 - History and Families. Nashville: Turner Publishing Company (1995).

Notes

References

External links

Houston County Chamber of Commerce
 Houston County, TNGenWeb - free genealogy resources for the county

 
1871 establishments in Tennessee
Populated places established in 1871
Sam Houston
Middle Tennessee